Royal Wahingdoh FC (also known as Wahingdoh Sports Club) was an Indian professional football club based in Shillong, Meghalaya. Nicknamed "Royals", the club participated in I-League, then top flight of Indian football league system. Royal Wahingdoh holds the record for the highest number of consecutive Shillong Premier League titles, having won the finals in December 2010, 2011 and in 2012.

They have also competed in I-League 2nd Division during the 2013–14 season. They won the league by defeating Bhawanipore in the last match of the league and qualified to play for the 2014–15 season of the I-League.

History

1946–2010
Founded in 1946 as Wahingdoh Sports Club, the club based in Shillong, won numerous titles. However, with changing times and professionalisation, the amateur club began to face some amount of difficulty competing with younger clubs and it was then, that the decline began.

In 2007, Wahingdoh Sports Club was almost relegated to the 2nd Division League and as a result of inconsistent performance, the Wahingdoh community felt the need for a younger and more innovative approach.

In 2008, the club turned professional when it merged with Royal Football Club before being renamed Royal Wahingdoh FC under the able leadership of the club's owner Dominic Sutnga Tariang. With the club witnessing several dramatic changes, a new chapter was in the making and in the very same year, the club bounced back to claim Third spot in the 2nd Div Regional League, a sign that brought hope for a brighter future.

In the First Division 2009 season they established a record by winning all their games besides scoring 52 goals en route to lifting the title and along with it, an entry into the top tier of Meghalaya football, the Shillong Premier League."

2010–2015
Royal Wahingdoh FC was Shillong's one of the two most popular clubs. In the 2010 season, they lifted the Shillong Premier League – in their debut season. In 2011, Carlton Chapman was appointed as new head coach, and they lifted the trophy in 2011 and 2012.

In 2011, the club signed Liberian international Bekay Bewar who helped the side gaining promotion to the I-League, and was retained by the Shillong based side for there season. The same year, they lifted Bordoloi Trophy.

In 2014, Royal Wahingdoh achieved their biggest success after winning the I-League 2nd Division, then second tier of indian football league system. They qualified for the 2014 I-League 2nd Division Final Round and finished on top spot with 18 points in 8 matches after defeating Bhawanipore F.C. in the final match. Thus they were declared as the debutants of the 2014–15 I-League season. They have also participated in the 2014 Federation Cup.

Santosh Kashyap was appointed the head coach for newly promoted Royal Wahingdoh before the start of the 2014–15 I-League. They signed Trinidad and Tobago international Densill Theobald as marquee player, who represented his nation at the 2006 FIFA World Cup. Under his coaching, Royal Wahingdoh stun eventual champions Mohun Bagan AC by 3–2 margin, and ended the season in third position with 30 points in 20 league matches.

Disfunction 
After finishing third in the top tier domestic league, Royal Wahingdoh pulled out of I-League and Santosh Kashyap left the club.
Though the club was granted a national license to compete in 2015–16 I-League, they decided to pull out, citing lack of a clear roadmap for the league as the reason.

For Wahingdoh, which operated on a budget of Rs 6-7 crore in their only I-League season, it was about making a tough choice. Instead of pumping in more money for playing in a league where they got no recognition and no visibility, they chose to put the same money into building infrastructure and scouting for more talent.

Stadiums

Royal Wahingdoh use the Jawaharlal Nehru Stadium in Shillong as their home ground for games in Shillong Premier League. They have also used this venue for the games of the older editions of the I-League. With artificial turf, the stadium has a seating capacity of 30,000 spectators.

Rivalries

Shillong derby
Royal Wahingdoh had a rivalry with local side Shillong Lajong FC in both the I-League and Shillong Premier League.
Shillong Lajong vs Royal Wahingdoh (Shillong Derby)

Kit manufacturers and shirt sponsors

Seasons

2011 season
In 2011, it was announced that Royal Wahingdoh FC would join the newly re-done I-League 2nd Division. The club appointed UEFA Pro Licence holder Volker Hofferbert as its head coach while Carlton Chapman and newly appointed coach from Manipur, Nandakumar Singh have been assigned the roles of assistant coaches. They won their opening match 3–1. They won their second match against Chandini FC 3–0. They won the third match 2–1 and fourth match 3–1 against Vasco SC. They won their fifth match in row against Eagles FC 3–2.Currently they have the longest winning streak in 2011 I-League 2nd Division. They won all their matches in Group C and qualified to 2011 I-League 2nd Division Final Round. Royal started their final round in by losing two and drawing one out of the 3 games played. After six rounds in final round, they won one match and lost 3 of them and are in 5th position with 5 points. 

Royal Wahingdoh have also entered into the 2011 Federation Cup, topping the group during the qualifying round with wins in all their matches and faced Mohan Bagan in their first match. RWFC beat Mohun Bagan 2–1 courtesy a brace from Chenco. This was followed by a 2–1 win over Churchill Brothers FC. However, the Royals lost to local rivals Shillong Lajong FC in the final group match and though both Shillong teams ended up with 6 points, it was Lajong that progressed on the head-to-head rule.

2012 season
Royal Wahingdoh F.C. qualified for the final round of the 2012 I-league 2nd Division. During the preliminary phase, they won 5 matches and drew 2 of their games. In the final round, the team fielded four foreigners against ONGC F.C. which the club claimed was an 'honest' blunder. According to AIFF rules, no side can field more than three foreigners at a time. They won the match 4–1, but the game was eventually awarded 3–0 to ONGC F.C. 
.

The 'Royals,' as they are fondly referred to by fans, secured their third successive Shillong Premier League title, which is a new record. The final was won 3–1 against Rangdajied United F.C. who fielded their first side including Babatunde, Jeribe, Enyinnaya and Argha. In the match, the scores were locked at 1–1 after regulation time with Beekay being RWFC's lone goal scorer. Babatunde headed in an equaliser in the second half to put his side in contention. However, it was the extra time goals by Chencho and Milancy that did it for the 'Royals' and in the process, hand them their third successive finals win.

2014 season
Royal Wahingdoh won 2014 I-League 2nd Division and will be promoted to 2014–15 I-League. The club has also appointed Santosh Kashyap as their Manager for the upcoming I-League season. In the same year, its youth side went on a trip to South Africa.

2014–15 season
Royal finished a 3rd in the I-league. India football team players like Jackichand Singh, Reagan Singh, Satiyasen Singh appeared with Wahingdoh.

2015–16 season
Though the club was granted national license to compete in 2015–16 I-League, they decided to pull out, citing lack of clear roadmap for the league as the reason. The club had earlier failed to comply with AFC licensing criteria as their home stadium did not adhere to the credentials. The club continues to participate in other tournaments; State League and the AIFF organised youth league tournaments (U-15 & U-18 leagues).

Former players
For all former notable players of Royal Wahingdoh with Wikipedia articles, see: Royal Wahingdoh FC players.

Foreign players
  Atsushi Yonezawa (2013–2014)
  Badmus Babatunde (2012–2013)
  Asim Jung Karki (2013–2014)
  Edmilson Marques Pardal (2011–2012)
  Bekay Bewar (2011–2014)
  Loveday Enyinnaya (2014–2015)
  Chencho Nio (2011–2012)
  Chencho Dorji (2011–2012)
  Densill Theobald (2014–2015)
  Kareem Omolaja (2011–2013)
 Kim Song-yong (2014–2015)

Honours

League
I-League
Third place (1): 2014–15
I-League 2nd Division
Champions (1): 2014
Shillong Premier League
Champions (3): 2010, 2011, 2012
Runners-up (3): 2011,  2013, 2015

Cup
Bordoloi Trophy
Champions (1): 2011

See also

 List of football clubs in Meghalaya

References

Further reading

External links
 Royal Wahingdoh FC at Soccerway
Royal Wahingdoh FC at Khel Now
Royal Wahingdoh FC at Global Sports Archive

 
Football clubs in Meghalaya
I-League clubs
I-League 2nd Division clubs
Association football clubs established in 1946
1946 establishments in India
Sport in Shillong